Building a New Scotland is a series of papers published by the Scottish Government that seeks to lay out a prospectus for Scottish independence. The Scottish Government has proposed holding an independence referendum on 19 October 2023.

History 
On 7 September 2021, Nicola Sturgeon stated that she would resume the case for independence and restart work on a prospects for independence.

On 13 June 2022, Nicola Sturgeon published the first independence paper.

On 14 July 2022, Nicola Sturgeon published the second independence paper.

Reaction 
On 15 June 2022, Alyn Smith an SNP politician welcomed the release of the first independence paper as a breath of fresh air and stated that the paper proves that the UK does not work for Scotland.

On 16 June 2022, Douglas Ross the leader of the Scottish conservatives stated that Nicola Sturgeon had her priorities wrong and should concentrate on recovery instead of independence.

Series titles

Series breakdown

Modern World: Wealthier, Happier, Fairer: Why Not Scotland? 
The first paper in the series examines other countries in Europe of similar size to Scotland and compares economic and social indicators with the United Kingdom.

Renewing Democracy Through Independence 
The second paper sets out the current context of Scotland within the United Kingdom, and why independence would allow for democratic renewal.

A stronger economy with independence 

The third paper set out the economic case for independence, where the focus would be on building a inclusive, fair and wellbeing economy. The document set up a path for a new currency, re-joining the European Union and using remaining oil reserves to build a wealth fund.

See Also
 Scotland's Future
 The Case for an Independent Socialist Scotland

References 

2022 books
English-language books
Scottish books
Scottish independence